Phool Aur Kaante is a 1991 Indian Hindi-language action-romance film directed by Kuku Kohli. It stars Ajay Devgan, Madhoo, Aruna Irani, Jagdeep and Amrish Puri among others. The film marked the debut of Devgan, son of late stunt and action choreographer Veeru Devgan, and Madhoo, niece of actress Hema Malini. The film was a superhit and won Devgan the Filmfare Award for Best Male Debut for 1991. This film was remade in Telugu as Varasudu. The film is loosely based on the Malayalam film Parampara directed by Sibi Malayil where Mammootty plays dual roles as Johnny, the protagonist and Lawrence, his father.

Phool Aur Kaante was noted for its soundtrack and action sequences. Devgn's entry in the film became very popular where he appeared standing, balancing on two moving motorcycles. Similar stunts have been repeated in a number of films since, sometimes by Devgn himself.

Some scenes of the film were shot at Vanganga Lake near Silvassa (capital of the then union territory of Dadra and Nagar Haveli).

Upon release, the film received positive response both from critics and audience. Despite released along with a much bigger star studded Lamhe, it emerged as a major success at box office and was the fifth highest-grossing film of that year.

Synopsis
Nageshwar alias "Don" (Amrish Puri) heads a vast criminal empire. He has an only son, Ajay (Ajay Devgn). So is Ajay's wife, Pooja (Madhoo), who would like to put an end to all these criminal activities. When Nageshwar starts showing signs of ageing, he decides that it is now time for Ajay to take over from him. Ajay does so, however, a number of Nageshwar's associates are unhappy, embittered, and critical of this choice, and as a result, they, under the leadership of Shankar Dhanraj kidnap Ajay's baby son, Gopal. Will Nageshwar negotiate his grandson's release, or will his grandson be another sacrifice of his "empire"? How will Ajay and his wife react to this?

Cast
 Ajay Devgan as Ajay Salgaonkar
 Madhoo as Pooja Salgaonkar (née Singh), Ajay's wife.
 Amrish Puri as Nageshwar "Don" Salgaonkar, Ajay's father.
 Arif Khan as Rocky college student
 Raza Murad as Shankar Dhanraj
 Satyendra Kapoor as College Principal
 Anjana Mumtaz as Lakshmi Salgaonkar, Nageshwar's late wife and Ajay's late mother.
 Aparajita Bhushan as Mrs. Singh, Pooja's mother.
 Goga Kapoor as Jagga Dhanraj, Shankar's brother.
 Suresh Chatwal as Brijlal Tiwari
 Dan Dhanoa as Drug Dealer
 Aruna Irani as Professor Batliwala
 Jagdeep as Professor Bihari
 Iqbal Durrani as Dhanraj
 Purnima as Mrs. Salgaonkar, Don's mother and Ajay's grandmother.
 Pankaj Berry as Ajay's college friend (cameo appearance)
 Brahmachari as Police Inspector
 Rana Jung Bahadur as Shankar's henchman
 Ghanshyam Rohera as College Office Peon

Awards
 37th Filmfare Awards:

Won

 Best Male Debut – Ajay Devgn

Nominated

 Best Supporting Actor – Amrish Puri
 Best Music Director – Nadeem–Shravan

Soundtrack
The soundtrack of Phool Aur Kaante was composed by the music duo Nadeem Shravan. The lyrics were written by Sameer and Rani Malik. The album was a superhit and the songs "Tumse Milne Ko Dil Karta Hai", "Dheere Dheere Pyar Ko Badhana Hai", "Maine Pyaar Tumhi Se Kiya Hai" (inspired by Pakistani Film Song "Mujhe Dekh Ke Been Bajain" sung by Musarrat Nazir Composed by M.Ashraf) were very popular. Singers  Kumar Sanu, Anuradha Paudwal, Udit Narayan, Alka Yagnik and Alisha Chinai rendered their voices in this album.

References

External links
 

1991 films
1990s Hindi-language films
Films scored by Nadeem–Shravan
1990s action drama films
Hindi remakes of Malayalam films
1990s masala films
Indian action drama films
1991 drama films
Hindi films remade in other languages
Silvassa
Films directed by Kuku Kohli